Hujjat al-Islam Seyed Mehdi Ghoreishi (is an Iranian Shiite cleric, Representative of the Supreme Leader in West Azerbaijan and Imam Jumu'ah prayer of Urmia. He is son of the Ali Akbar Ghoreishi member of Assembly of Experts. Seyid Mehdi Ghoreishi is second representative of the Supreme Leader and imam Jumu'ah prayer after Iranian Revolution.

References

Living people
People from Urmia
Representatives of the Supreme Leader in the Provinces of Iran
People from East Azerbaijan Province
Year of birth missing (living people)